Windhoek West is a suburb of Windhoek, the capital of Namibia.  The Namibia University of Science and Technology (formerly the Polytechnic of Namibia) is located in Windhoek-West. 

Electorally, Windohoek West is located in the Windhoek West constituency.

References

Suburbs of Windhoek